Gaisano Mall of Davao, branded as GMall of Davao, is a major shopping mall located along J.P. Laurel Avenue, Bajada, Davao City, Philippines, part of the Gaisano Malls operated by DSG Sons Group, Inc. with a gross land area of , and a total floor area of  including the multilevel car park building.

Establishment
The mall opened on April 20, 1997, with only 4 floors.

Features

It is the largest of more than 40 Gaisano malls in the Philippines and the largest mall in Davao City and in Mindanao.

The 6-story mall houses about 620 to 700 retail stores and shops. It consists stores and restaurants, a department store, a supermarket on the ground floor, and a cinema on the top floor. It also has an arcade. It is the only mall in Davao City that has a Red Carpet Theater - a luxury movie theater with leather couches.

The Peak 
At the topmost part of the mall is "The Peak" which is located at 6th level, a new attraction for shoppers, which was intentionally built to compete with SM Davao's The Annex, SM Lanang Premier's Fountain Court and Abreeza's high-end restaurants.

Incidents
5 people have died by suicide inside the mall since 2014. the first suicide incident was recorded on August 20, 2013, the second on March 17, 2014; the third was on November 6, 2015; the fourth on February 11, 2017; and the latest was on January 6, 2019. After series of suicide incidents inside Gaisano Mall, the management has put barriers on the fifth floor of the mall to further avoid fatal incident in the future.
Another case of suicide happened during September 13, 2022, wherein a 22 year old man from Kidapawan City was found dead from falling down Gaisano Mall of Davao's multi-story parking building.
The mall was subjected to one of the two terrorist bombings that occurred on September 17, 2013, the other one being at SM City Davao. It happened during the time of armed crisis in Zamboanga City, which involved elements of the Moro National Liberation Front (MNLF); however, the MNLF Davao Regional Command denied that they were behind the bombings.
A small fire occurred on April 10, 2019, at a pizza parlor of Shakeys branch, located at the upper ground floor of the mall.

References

Shopping malls in Davao City
Shopping malls established in 1997
1997 establishments in the Philippines